Approx is a caching proxy server for Debian archive files.
It is an HTTP-based proxy server for Debian-style package archives. It fetches files from remote repositories on demand, and caches them for local use.

Memory and time saver

Approx can save time and network bandwidth if .deb packages need to be installed or upgraded for a number of machines on a local network. Each package is downloaded from a remote site only once, regardless of how many local clients install it. The approx cache typically requires a few gigabytes of disk space.

Administration

Approx can simplify the administration of client machines; repository locations need only be changed in approx's configuration file, not in every client's /etc/apt/sources.list file.

Apt-proxy replacement

Approx can be used as a replacement for apt-proxy, with no need to modify clients' /etc/apt/sources.list files, or as an alternative to apt-cacher."

References 

Debian